Fabio Filzi (20 November 1884 – 12 July 1916) was an ethnic-Italian who was born in the Austria-Hungarian Empire but was a irredentist patriot whose firm belief was that the Italian portions of Austria-Hungarian Empire should be united with Italy. He was captured and executed by the Austria-Hungarian Army with his superior Cesare Battisti.

Early life

He was born in Pisino, Istria (now Pazin, Croatia), the second of the four sons of Giovanni Battista (1852-1933) and Amelia Ivancich (1861-1942). His mother was an Istrian Italian native of Pisino. His father was originally from Borgo Sacco, near Rovereto, but worked as a teacher of classical philology in the high schools of Pisino and Capodistria (now Koper, Slovenia). In 1892 he obtained the chair at the high school of Rovereto and returned to Trentino, bringing the family with him. As a result, Filzi began his high school studies in Koper and finished them brilliantly in Rovereto in 1902. He came into contact with the irredentist circles of Trentino in 1901–1903.

In 1904, at the inauguration of the Italian law faculty of the University of Innsbruck, there had been clashes fomented by the Germans that had caused a death, several injuries and numerous arrests among the Italians, including Cesare Battisti; following these events, Filzi was head of the Rovereto protest movement. In the same year he was conscripted, being placed in the 4th hunting regiment of Salzburg of the Austria-Hungarian Empire. In November he ended up under investigation on charges of having favored the desertion of an Italian comrade; he was acquitted but was dismissed as "politically suspect" at the time of discharge. In the following years he was recalled three times, as usual, for military exercises and on one of these occasions he challenged an officer to a duel who had pronounced insults against Italy; only the intervention of the commander averted the clash.

In 1905, in the presence of some Treviso gymnasts visiting Rovereto, he recited an impassioned speech against the Austro-Hungarian empire and promised his commitment to the cause of the Italians in the unredeemed lands. In the meantime he attended university studies, enrolling at the same time in Graz at the faculty of law and at Trieste at the "Revoltella" commercial school. He took an active part in the National League, the Society of Trentino students and the Giovine Trieste.

In November 1906 he went with his brother Ezio to Graz to join the Italian students who, asking for more government concessions in school, had blocked university activities. Both were injured in clashes with German ethnic elements. After graduating in law from the University of Graz in 1910, he returned first to Trieste and then to Rovereto, where he devoted himself to being a lawyer at the law firm of Antonio Piscel.

Military career

He deserted the Austro-Hungarian army to fight, as a volunteer for Italy, in the First World War. On 10 July 1916 the Vicenza Battalion, formed by the 59th, 60th, 61st Companies and a Marching Company commanded by Lieutenant Cesare Battisti, of which the second lieutenant Filzi was subordinate, received the order to occupy Monte Corno (m. 1765) on the right of the Leno in Vallarsa.

Capture and death sentence 
He was taken prisoner together with Cesare Battisti on 10 July 1916 and recognized immediately after his superior. Almost certainly the Austrians had been informed for some days of the presence of Battisti in the area, but not that of Filzi. In the episode, the Trentino soldier Bruno Franceschini, an Austrian soldier, was present during the hours of the capture of the two irredentists. With Battisti, he was brought to Trento, tried and sentenced to death for high treason. The sentence was executed by hanging at 19.30 on 12 July 1916 in the Buonconsiglio Castle, Austria-Hungarian Empire, now Buonconsiglio Castle in Italy. 
In Arzignano, a town where he was a guest before leaving for the front, a monument was dedicated to him.

Honours

HMS Upright sunk the Italian freighter Fabio Filzi on 13 December 1941. HMS Utmost had earlier attacked and missed the freighter on 12 December 1941.
In 1966 had his likeness on an Italian postage stamp
 One of the Tunnels (No. 13) in the Strada delle 52 Gallerie is named after him.

Fausto Filzi

In September 1916, following the execution, Fabio's brother Fausto Filzi decided to return to Italy from Argentina, the place where he was working, to avenge his brother's martyrdom. Arriving in command of Verona on 21 October he volunteered in the 9th Artillery regiment from Fortress with the rank of second lieutenant. He died on June 8, 1917, on Monte Zebio in a battle which earned him the silver medal for military valour.

Bibliography
Notes

References 

 - Total pages: 232 
 - Total pages: 624 
 

1884 births
1916 deaths
People from Trento
People from the County of Tyrol
Italian irredentism
Italian military personnel killed in World War I
Recipients of the Gold Medal of Military Valor
People executed by Austria-Hungary
People executed for treason against Austria-Hungary
People executed by Austria by hanging
Executed Italian people